T Shirt is a 1976 album by Loudon Wainwright III. Unlike his earlier records, this (and the subsequent Final Exam) saw Wainwright adopt a full blown rock band (Slowtrain) - though there are acoustic songs on T Shirt, including a talking blues. According to Wainwright on the 2006 CD liner notes, it received a scathing review from Rolling Stone which depressed him so much he stayed in bed for five days. By the early 1990s, he disowned the album in a radio interview broadcast in Australia. However, by the time of the CD remaster (which included Final Exam) he admitted to a much more sympathetic view of the album(s), which he referred to as his 'puppies'.

Track listing
All tracks composed by Loudon Wainwright III; except where indicated

"Bicentennial"
"Summer's Almost Over"
"Hollywood Hopeful" (Traditional; arranged and adapted by Loudon Wainwright III)
"Reciprocity"
"At Both Ends"
"Wine with Dinner"
"Hey Packy" (George Gerdes)
"California Prison Blues"
"Talking Big Apple '75"
"Prince Hal's Dirge"
"Just Like President Thieu"
"Wine with Dinner (Night Cap)"

Personnel

Musicians 
Loudon Wainwright III - guitar, banjo, bells, vocals
Richard Davis - bass
Hank Jones - keyboards
David Sanborn - saxophone
Marvin Stamm - cornet, trumpet
Jimmy Maelen - congas
Elliott Randall - electric guitar
David Taylor - bass trombone
Eric Weissberg - banjo
Charles Brown III - electric guitar
Jeanie Arnold - vocals
Jon Cobert - piano
Joe Cocuzzo - drums
Kenny Kosek - violin
Richard Crooks - drums, spoons
John Crowder - bass
Ron Getman - steel guitar
Don Hammond - alto recorder
Jimmy Iovine - backing vocals
Peter La Barbera - vibraphone
John Lissauer - clarinet, arrangements
George Marge - recorder
Irwin "Marky" Markowitz - cornet, trumpet
Charlie Messing - guitar, vocals
Gwynne Michaels - backing vocals
Glen Mitchell - clavinet, electric piano, organ
Paul Prestopino, Maggie & Terre Roche - vocals
Christie Thompson - backing vocals
Stephen Tubin - organ, piano, synthesizer
Joanne Vent - backing vocals

Technical  
Jimmy Iovine - engineer, mixing
Benno Friedman - cover photography

Release history
LP: Arista AL4063 (U.S.)
LP: Arista RTY127 (UK)
CD: Arcadia ACAD 8142 (2 CD with Final Exam (U.S. 2007)

References

"Prince Hals Dirge" is a reference to Henry IV, Part II by Shakespeare
"Just Like President Thieu" references South Vietnam's recently deposed Prime Minister Nguyễn Văn Thiệu
"Bicentennial" is a sarcastic reference to the United States's upcoming 'birthday', where Wainwright celebrates heroes like Jack Ruby
"California Prison Blues" is a time capsule, referencing Charles Manson, 'Squeaky' Lynette Fromme, Patty Hearst (and her father), Timothy Leary, and Eldridge Cleaver.
"Wine with Dinner" mentions Dean Martin and Foster Brooks

Loudon Wainwright III albums
1976 albums
Arista Records albums